Tricholoma subresplendens is a mushroom of the agaric genus Tricholoma. It was first described by American mycologist William Alphonso Murrill in 1914.

See also
List of North American Tricholoma

References

External links
 

Fungi described in 1914
Fungi of North America
subresplendens
Taxa named by William Alphonso Murrill